The Srimad Bhagavata is one of the main books of Hindu philosophy. The Bhagavata is a devotional account of the Supreme Being and His incarnations. The third book of the Srimad Bhagavata covers the teachings of Rishi Maitreya to Vidura, Vishnu's Boar incarnation, the curse of Vishnu's attendants, and the teachings of Kapila Muni. This book consists of 33 chapters. The Bhagavata is authored by Veda Vyasa and the source material for this summary is the translation presented by Swami Tapasyananda. Additional material and analysis is included.

For the events leading up to this point, see Srimad Bhagavata Book 2.

Chapter 1
	At the end of Book 2 of the Bhagavata, Raja Parikshit asks Suka Rishi for more information about the creation of the universe.
	Suka Rishi continues his narration to Parikshit by relating the conversation between Vidura (Dhritarashtra’s Prime Minister) and Rishi Maitreya, where similar topics about the creation of the universe were discussed
Vidura’s history is given, especially the incidents where Vidura gave correct advice, but Dhritarashtra rejected it and hurt the Pandavas to favor his own children
	Vidura leaves the palace and goes on a pilgrimage
	Vidura meets Uddhava (Krishna's great devotee and helper) and inquires about the welfare of Krishna and His people

Chapter 2
	In response to Vidura's questions about Krishna, Uddhava, who had been greatly devoted to Krishna since childhood, spoke to Vidura overcome with emotion for Krishna
	Uddhava is greatly disappointed to tell of Krishna leaving His earthly form
	Uddhava is also saddened that the citizens of Dwaraka, Krishna's relatives, treated Krishna as an ordinary person, and not as the Supreme Lord incarnate
	The Yadavas did not realize that the Supreme Being was living with them, and kept asking Krishna to fulfill petty tasks for them.
	Uddhava reminisces about Krishna's acts and glories
	Uddhava tells the first part of Krishna's story with deep love and devotion, covering Krishna's birth and His time in Gokula and Vrindavana
	Even those who were Krishna's enemies attained Krishna's Supreme State simply because they were killed by Krishna
	Krishna subdued Indra’s pride by stopping the sacrifices made to Indra. When Indra retaliated, Krishna then protected His people from Indra's anger (heavy rain and thunderstorms) by lifting Mount Govardhana with one hand to shield them.

Chapter 3
	Uddhava continues his description of Krishna's acts and glories
	Krishna (as a 10-year-old boy) destroys Kamsa and the best wrestlers (all of whom were demons incarnate)
	Krishna's family life and children
	Krishna's wars, and His actions to lighten the burden of the Earth by destroying the bad rulers, who had become corrupt and selfish

Chapter 4
	Uddhava describes how the Yadavas were cursed by Holy Men, and how the Yadavas destroyed themselves as a result.
	Krishna could have nullified the curse, but chose not to, as this was the best way to destroy the Yadavas. The Yadavas had become excessively strong and arrogant because of Krishna's strength, and would try to conquer and plunder the earth after Krishna left.
	Uddhava could not bear separation from Krishna at the end of Krishna's time on Earth. Uddhava follows Krishna, and sees Krishna 
	With a blue complexion
	In a completely peaceful form and demeanor
	Having 4 arms and a yellow cloth
	Krishna gives Uddhava the Highest Knowledge about Bhagavata Dharma (supreme devotion)
	Vidura asks Uddhava to give him this Knowledge, but Uddhava tells Vidura that Krishna had instructed Rishi Maitreya to teach this knowledge to Vidura
	Vidura feels blessed that Krishna remembered him before departing from Earth.
	Uddhava was appointed by Krishna to continue His mission after He left
	Vidura leaves Uddhava to learn the Highest Knowledge from Rishi Maitreya
	Uddhava leaves for Badrikashrama, where his mind is merged into Krishna in Samadhi

Chapter 5
	Vidura is Yama reborn on earth as he was cursed.
	Vidura asks Rishi Maitreya about devotion to the Supreme, the creation of the universe, and Vishnu's sportive actions.
	People with desires act to create happiness and remove unhappiness. However, their actions often end up having the opposite effect.
	Rishi Maitreya begins to answer Vidura's questions.
	Anyone who hears/reads about Narayana's glories with devotion will be freed from sadness and suffering.
	Rishi Maitreya begins to describe the creation of the Universe.
	Initially, only the Brahman (the non-dual essence) was present. Everything was dissolved in Him by His will.
	The Brahman was not able to observe this, as there was no creation for the Brahman to reflect in. This is because the seer and the seen are two different entities. (Without a mirror), the eyes cannot see themselves. By this same logic, the body and the Atman must be different.
	The Brahman, through the power of Maya (illusion that leads the Jiva, which is an aspect of Brahman to think that He is involved in the play of Nature), began the process of Creation, resulting in the primordial Universe.
	This further led to the creation of the Mahattattva (great element), from which all the categories/elements of creation came.
	Then, the elements, sense perceptions, sense organs, organs of action, I-sense, Deities, etc. were created.
	However, these elements existed in an uncombined inert state.
	All the Deities praised Mahavishnu as the one who can save beings from Samsara (the cycle of birth and Death).

Chapter 6
	Rishi Maitreya continues his teachings to Vidura.
	Mahavishnu enters into the categories and gives their combinations life. This resulted in the creation of the Virat Purusha (entire universe represented as one being).
	This Virat Purusha is the first incarnation of the Brahman.
	The Virat Purusha has 3 powers: 
	Consciousness (the divine spirit)
	Action (the Prana, or life-breath)
	The ability to enjoy actions.
	Each limb (organ) of Virat has one Deity, one power, and one function.
	For example, the first part to form is the mouth.
	The Deity of the mouth is Agni. 
	The power and function of the mouth are speech.
	The various parts of the Virat Purusha then become the universe and its constituent worlds.
	For example, the head of the Virat Purusha is Heaven, and the feet are earth.
	The Glories of the Lord are Infinite. This description of the Creation of the Universe is just an infinitesimal sample.

Chapter 7
	Maya (Mahavishnu's illusive power) is the power that makes the Jiva (which is really the Infinite Atman) think it is a finite body
	This illusion is removed by devotion, dedication of actions to God, and knowledge of the Truth
	Difference between the Jiva and Iswara
	Comparison of life to the dream state
	Iswara (God) is in the state of spiritual realization
	Jiva (the individual soul) is in the state of material life 
	The material experiences ‘experienced’ by the Jiva are no more real to the Atman than the dream state is to the waking individual
	The way to overcome this illusion is devotion of God
	Vidura's questions
	How were the worlds/people created
	Why are people grouped into Varnas and Ashramas and what are each one's duties
	What are the rewards and punishments for actions

Chapter 8
	Rishi Maitreya presents another story of the origin of the Bhagavata
	Sankarshna (a form of Vishnu) taught the Bhagavata to the Sages when they asked Him about this knowledge
	Before creation, Mahavishnu was “sleeping” on Shesha in the Causal Waters, with the proto-universe present in a dissolved condition latent in Him
	Mahavishnu's power of Time (as per Mahavishnu's instructions) awakened Mahavishnu 
	This led to the start of creation in the form of a Lotus Bud.
	Brahma was created from this Lotus.
	Brahma tried to see where the Lotus came from, but could not find its start. 
	After unsuccessfully searching outside, by searching in the Causal Waters, Brahma found its origin by inward Meditation
	Brahma gets a vision of Mahavishnu resting on Shesha in the Causal Waters
	Brahma saw Mahavishnu's smile which spreads happiness and removes sadness from all

Chapter 9
Brahma praises Mahavishnu as the source and support of the entire Universe
	People do not truly know Mahavishnu
	Nothing exists besides Mahavishnu – everything visible or invisible is just an aspect of Mahavishnu's cosmic form
	All material objects are the products of Maya
	The sense of ego and attachment should be decreased until it goes away. This can be accomplished by Devotion to Mahavishnu.
	Life is full of sufferings, which can be mitigated and even avoided by Devotion.
	All works are far better (both materially and spiritually) when offered to Mahavishnu.
	Everything (all beings, objects, states, and actions) in the world has an end
	However, offerings made to Mahavishnu will exist forever, as Mahavishnu is eternal.
	As long as people act incorrectly, they will be destroyed by Time (Death).
	Mahavishnu's reply to Brahma and His blessings
	Until an individual develops Devotion to the Supreme, God cannot be realized. Once Devotion is developed, God can be (quickly) realized.
	Action without attachment does not bind an individual.
	Rajas (the middle of the 3 Gunas) is the cause of sin, as it has desire and greed
	Rajas is involved in the creation of anything
	Doing actions fully dedicated to Mahavishnu results in no accumulation of sins
	Therefore, as long as actions are dedicated to Mahavishnu, actions, work, duty, and even reasonable enjoyments do not result in the creation of sins or bondages. Actions dedicate to Mahavishnu do not trap an individual in Samsara.
	Whoever reads Brahma's praises of Mahavishnu daily will soon achieve Mahavishnu's grace.

Chapter 10 
	The second part of the creation of the Universe (Visarga, Brahma's creation)
	The entire Universe came from the expanding Lotus-bud.
	The entire universe was there in a latent state all along, and Brahma was to bring it into a visible form.
	First the 3 worlds were created 
	Bhu (the Earth)
	Bhava (the atmosphere)
	Swah (Heaven)
	These 3 worlds are for beings in the cycle of Samsara.
	There are 4 worlds created by Brahma above these 3
	These are for beings on the path to gradual salvation.
	These are Maharloka, Janaloka, Tapaloka, Satyaloka.
	Time, as Mahavishnu's aspect of creation, preservation, and destruction is beginningless and endless
	10 Aspects of creation
	The first six are created by Mahavishnu directly, and are the fundamental structure of the Universe
	Mahattattva – the great element
	Ahankara – the ego (I-sense; sense of difference between me and you)
	Tanmatras – the subtle aspects of the 5 elements (earth, water, fire, air, space)
	Organs of knowledge (senses) (5) and action (limbs, ...) (5)
	Mind and the presiding deities over the organs
	Avidya – Ignorance about the spiritual nature of the Atman
	The last four are created by Brahma, and form the secondary creation
	Plants
	Animals
	Humans
	Devas
	Brahma is an aspect of the Supreme, given the duty of Creation

Chapter 11
	The nature of Time.
	The smallest particle is termed a Paramanu. It cannot be subdivided, and all “other things” are just combinations of it.
	The subtle aspect of Time is Sri Hari's power to control the universe.
	The Time that we see is its gross aspect.
	Units of time ranging from a fraction of a second to millions of years.
	Everything should be seen in terms of irreducible units.
	Surya (the sun) is another form of Narayana, as a visible form of Time
	There are 4 ages of Time 
	In descending order of morality, Krita, Treta, Dwapara, and Kali 
	The current age is Kaliyuga
	In Krita, Dharma (proper conduct and duty) is observed fully.
	Dharma decreases in each age.
	At the end of each cycle, all the worlds are destroyed. They are re-created at the start of the next cycle.
	The units of Time have no meaning with respect to the Supreme, as the Supreme is above any notion of finiteness.
	The entire Universe is like an infinitesimal particle to Mahavishnu.

Chapter 12
	Brahma created 5 types of ignorance
	Not knowing one's own True Nature as the Infinite Atman
	Association with the notion of ‘I’ with respect to the body/mind/senses
	Insatiable longing for enjoyments
	Anger at any obstructions when seeking enjoyments
	Dejection at the loss of enjoyments
	Brahma is disappointed after creating these sources of spiritual ignorance and material destruction.
	To remedy this, Brahma creates 4 very great sages – Sanaka, Sanandana, Sanatana, and Sanatakumara
	Brahma asked them to populate the worlds, but they refused as they were established in the Atman.
	Creation of Rudra from Brahma's anger, when the sages did not populate the worlds.
	Rudra has a ferocious, aggressive form.
	Rudra created beings like himself.
	Rudra then performed tapas, in order to create better beings.
	Brahma created more beings in order to begin the procreation of the universe
	Brahma created the Vedas
	Brahma created the 4 parts of Dharma
	Learning
	Charity
	Austerity
	Purity
	Brahma creates the 4 Ashramas (states of life)
	Brahmacharin (student living with the Guru, not thinking of pleasures)
	Householder
	Vanaprastha (the first stage of renunciation)
	Sannyasin (complete renunciation)
	Each Ashramas has 4 sub-categories depending on how well one performs it
	Knowledge has 4 ends
	Moksha (freedom from the cycle of Death)
	Dharma (duty and righteousness)
	Artha (wealth)
	Kama (pleasure)
	Brahma creates language and sound
	Brahma creates man and woman in order to populate the world
	The first man was Swayambhuva Manu 
	The first woman was Satarupa

Chapter 13
	Vidura asks Rishi Maitreya to hear more about the Manu's story
	The glories of listening to stories about Mahavishnu's devotees, as they generate devotion to Mahavishnu.
	Brahma gives Manu the work of populating the Earth and protecting Dharma and the Vedas
	Work is only meaningful and fruitful if Mahavishnu is pleased by it. 
	Manu cannot perform the work given to him by Brahma as the Earth was submerged in the Causal Waters.
	Brahma thought about Mahavishnu to solve this problem, and Mahavishnu incarnated as a very small Boar that immediately grew to a huge size.
	Mahavishnu (the Lord of Yajna [sacrifice]) rescued the Earth and destroyed Hiranyaksha (a very powerful demon)
	The Rishis praise this Incarnation.
	Each part of the body of Mahavishnu's incarnation as a Boar has a symbolic meaning in the Vedas/Yajnas.
	It is impossible to find the end of Mahavishnu's excellences. 
	Those who hear or narrate with devotion the story of this incarnation of Mahavishnu quickly receive Mahavishnu's grace and blessings.

References

Krishna
Puranas
Hindu texts
Vaishnava texts